was a Japanese production designer and art director. She was nominated for the Academy Award for Best Art Direction for her work in Akira Kurosawa's film Ran (1985).
She was married to Yoshirō Muraki.

Filmography (as production designer) 
 So Young, So Bright (ジャンケン娘 Janken musume) (1955)
 Romantic Daughters (ロマンス娘 Romansu musume) (1956)
 Long Journey into Love (1973)

External links

Japanese art directors
Japanese production designers
1923 births
1997 deaths
People from Tokyo